The Barfüsserkloster in the old town of Zürich is a former Franciscan friary. It was first attested in the 1240s and was dissolved during the Reformation, in 1524.  
The friary was situated in the southeastern corner of the medieval city, between the Neumarkt and the Linden gates (today at Hirschengraben 13/15).

After the Reformation, the buildings were used as a grain depot, and during the early 19th century, as a casino. During the 19th century, most of the original structure was lost to significant construction work. The buildings since the 1870s have housed the cantonal court of law (Obergericht), besides the communal wine cellars and a theater. After a fire in 1890, part of the structure was removed, and is now a parking lot. The cantonal court remains the only occupant of the estate.

Bibliography
 Regine Abegg, Christine Barraud Wiener, Karl Grunder: Die Kunstdenkmäler des Kantons Zürich, Altstadt rechts der Limmat, Sakralbauten. Neue Ausgabe Band III.I, Gesellschaft für Schweizerische Kunstgeschichte, Bern 2002 
 Urs Amacher: Die Bruderschaften bei den Zürcher Bettelordensklöstern. – In: Bettelorden, Bruderschaften und Beginen in Zürich: Stadtkultur und Seelenheil im Mittelalter (ed. Barbara Helbling et al.), Verlag Neue Zürcher Zeitung, Zürich 2002, pp. 265–277 
 Erwin Eugster: Geschichte des Barfüsserklosters. – In: Bettelorden, Bruderschaften und Beginen in Zürich: Stadtkultur und Seelenheil im Mittelalter (ed. Barbara Helbling et al.), Verlag Neue Zürcher Zeitung, Zürich 2002, pp. 44–55 
 Thomas Germann: Zürich im Zeitraffer, Band II, Werd, Zürich 2002 
 Ulrich Helfenstein: Barfüsserkloster Zürich. - In: Helvetia sacra, Abt. 5: Der Franziskusorden. Francke, Bern 1978, Bd. 1 pp. 300–308
 Sigmund Widmer: Zürich – eine Kulturgeschichte, Band 3; Artemis, Zürich 1976 
 Dölf Wild: Zur Baugeschichte des Zürcher Barfüsserklosters. – In: Bettelorden, Bruderschaften und Beginen in Zürich: Stadtkultur und Seelenheil im Mittelalter, (ed. Barbara Helbling et al.), Verlag Neue Zürcher Zeitung, Zürich 2002, pp. 56–68

External links

Demolished buildings and structures in Zürich
Zurich Barfuserkloster
1524 disestablishments in Europe
16th-century disestablishments in the Old Swiss Confederacy
Religious buildings and structures in Zürich